The Swedish Radio Choir is a professional choir. It is part of Sveriges Radio, the public radio broadcasting company of Sweden. The choir consists of 32 singers and their chorus master Marc Korovitch. Peter Dijkstra is the choir's most recent chief conductor. He left the position after eleven years, in 2018. Since 1979 the Swedish Radio Choir has been based at the Swedish Radio Concert Hall, Berwaldhallen, in Stockholm.

In 2010 the Swedish Radio Choir was included in Gramophone magazine's special feature article where an international jury was asked to name the world's leading choirs.

Conductors
 1925 - 1952 Axel Nylander and Einar Ralf
 1952 - 1982 Eric Ericson
 1982 - 1985 Anders Öhrwall
 1986 - 1994 Gustaf Sjökvist
 1995 - 2001 Tõnu Kaljuste
 2002 - 2005 Stefan Parkman
 2007 - 2018 Peter Dijkstra
 since 2018 Marc Korovitch, chorus master

References

External links 
Official website (in Swedish)

Swedish choirs
National choirs
Radio and television performing groups
Musical groups established in 1925
1925 establishments in Sweden